The John Stang House at 629 Columbus Ave. in Sandusky, Ohio was built in 1922 by George Feick.  It was listed on the National Register of Historic Places in 1982.

It is significant for its association with John Stang, who was vice president of the Cleveland-Sandusky Brewing Company and was president of the M. Hommel Wine Company, two companies of economic importance.

References

Houses on the National Register of Historic Places in Ohio
Colonial Revival architecture in Ohio
Mission Revival architecture in Ohio
Houses completed in 1922
Houses in Erie County, Ohio
National Register of Historic Places in Erie County, Ohio